Digvijaya may refer to:

 Digvijaya (conquest), an Indian concept of conquest
 Digvijaya (film), a 1987 Indian film
 Digvijaya Singh (born 1947), Indian politician